The 1882 Cincinnati Red Stockings season was a season in American baseball. It was the first season for the team as a member of the American Association. This team took the nickname from the previous National League team that played during 1876–1879, but was otherwise unrelated. The Red Stockings (sometimes called the "Reds") won the first American Association championship this season.

Regular season

Before the season began, the Red Stockings named catcher Pop Snyder as the player-manager. Snyder spent the 1881 season with the Boston Red Caps of the National League, hitting .228 with 16 RBI. Cincinnati also signed some familiar players, as Will White and Hick Carpenter spent time with the Cincinnati Reds of the National League.  White saw limited action with the Detroit Wolverines, while Carpenter hit .216 with two home runs and 31 RBI with the Worcester Worcesters during the 1881 season.

Carpenter had a breakout season, as he led the AA with 67 RBI and 120 hits, and led the Red Stockings with a .342 batting average. Snyder hit .291 with a homer and 50 RBI, while Joe Sommer hit .288 with a homer, 29 RBI and a team high 82 runs, while leading the league with 354 at-bats. On the mound, White returned to his 1879 form, as he led the AA with 40 wins, while posting a 1.54 ERA in 480 innings pitched.

The Red Stockings lost their first ever game, as the Pittsburgh Alleghenys defeated Cincinnati 10–9 at Bank Street Grounds. The team hovered around the .500 level, as they had a record of 8–9 record in their first 17 games, sitting in fourth place. The Red Stockings then went on a 10-game winning streak and rose to first place in the American Association. Cincinnati stayed hot for the rest of the season, finishing with a 55–25 record and winning the American Association pennant, 11.5 games ahead of the second place Philadelphia Athletics.

Season standings

Record vs. opponents

Roster

Player stats

Batting

Starters by position
Note: Pos = Position; G = Games played; AB = At bats; H = Hits; Avg. = Batting average; HR = Home runs; RBI = Runs batted in

Other batters
Note: G = Games played; AB = At bats; H = Hits; Avg. = Batting average; HR = Home runs; RBI = Runs batted in

Pitching

Starting pitchers
Note: G = Games pitched; IP = Innings pitched; W = Wins; L = Losses; ERA = Earned run average; SO = Strikeouts

Other pitchers
Note: G = Games pitched; IP = Innings pitched; W = Wins; L = Losses; ERA = Earned run average; SO = Strikeouts

References

External links
1882 Cincinnati Red Stockings season at Baseball Reference

Cincinnati Reds seasons
Cincinnati Red Stockings season
Cincinnati Reds